The 2012–13 Mississippi Valley State Delta Devils basketball team represented Mississippi Valley State University during the 2012–13 NCAA Division I men's basketball season. The Delta Devils, led by first year head coach Chico Potts, played their home games at the Harrison HPER Complex and were members of the Southwestern Athletic Conference. Due to low APR scores, the Delta Devils were ineligible to participate in the post season, including the SWAC Tournament. One year after winning the SWAC and participating in the NCAA Tournament, they finished the season 2012–13 5–23, 5–13 in SWAC play to finish in eighth place.

Roster

Schedule

|-
!colspan=9| Exhibition

|-
!colspan=9| Regular Season

References

Mississippi Valley State Delta Devils basketball seasons
Mississippi Valley State
Mississippi Valley State Delta Devils basketball
Mississippi Valley State Delta Devils basketball